AEL Sistemas S.A. is a Brazilian-based defence electronics company. The company is a subsidiary of Elbit Systems with 25 percent acquired by the Embraer's defense division. AEL operates in the areas of fixed and rotary wings, unmanned vehicles, homeland security, armored vehicles, communication systems, contracted of logistics support, space systems and simulators.

AEL Sistemas participates of the transfer of technology program of Gripen NG, and will supply its avionics with innovative features such as a "wide area display" (WAD), a panoramic 19 by 8 inches touchscreen display similar to Lockheed F-35 panoramic cockpit display.

The company also developed the Link-BR2, a datalink with an advanced encrypted protocol and high degree of security, that allow the exchange of data such radar information, videos and images with other units of the three branches anytime and anywhere. Very few countries in the world developed this type of communication system.

References

Aerospace companies of Brazil
Avionics companies
Defence companies of Brazil
Brazilian brands
Manufacturing companies of Brazil
Weapons trade
Electronics companies of Brazil
Economy of Porto Alegre